Paraleptophlebia bicornuta is a species of pronggilled mayfly in the family Leptophlebiidae. It is found in North America.

References

External links

 

Mayflies
Articles created by Qbugbot
Insects described in 1926